Stevens Creek Boulevard is a major thoroughfare in Santa Clara County, California, spanning from San Carlos Street, in San Jose's West San Carlos district in the East to Permanente, in the Santa Cruz Mountains west of Cupertino. It is a part of the larger Stevens Creek Boulevard/San Carlos Street corridor. Freeways that intersect it include I-880/SR 17, SR 85, and I-280.

Stevens Creek is the primary boulevard in West San Jose and the West Valley, running between San Jose's Santana Row, an upscale shopping district, and Westfield Valley Fair, one of the largest shopping malls in the United States. The boulevard is the central artery of two San Jose's future urban villages: Stevens Creek and Santana Row.

References

External links
City of San Jose - Stevens Creek Boulevard - Deal Link April 6, 2019

Streets in San Jose, California
Streets in Santa Clara County, California